Henry Calder (3 July 1906 – 27 August 1970) was an Australian cricketer. He played one first-class match for Western Australia in 1932/33.

References

External links
 

1906 births
1970 deaths
Australian cricketers
Western Australia cricketers
Cricketers from Perth, Western Australia